The Tianjin Academy of Agricultural Sciences (TAAS) is an agricultural scientific research organization located in Tianjin, China. It oversees 15 institutes, including ten type one public-benefit institutions, three type two public-benefit institutions, and two transformation enterprises. It has four national research centers, six provincial key laboratories, and ten municipal research centers. It has more than 516 professional employees, including one academician from the Chinese Academy of Engineering (ACE), 64 State Council experts who enjoy special allowance and 10 experts with outstanding contribution.

History
The Tianjin Academy of Agricultural Sciences was established in 1979 after the reshuffle of Tianjin Institute of Paddy Rice, Tianjin Institute of Vegetables and Tianjin Institute of Alkaline Soils Restoration.

References

External links

Agricultural organizations based in China
1979 establishments in China
Government agencies established in 1979